Richard Field may refer to:

Richard Field (Jesuit) (1554?–1606), Anglo-Irish Jesuit
Richard Field (printer) (1561–1624), English printer and publisher, best known for his close association with the poems of William Shakespeare
Richard Field (theologian) (1561–1616), English ecclesiological theologian associated with the work of Richard Hooker
Richard Stockton Field (1803–1870), United States Senator from New Jersey, and later a United States federal judge
Richard Field (politician) (1866–1961), member of the Tasmanian Parliament
Richard Field (judge) (born 1947), judge of the High Court of England and Wales
Richard Field (footballer) (1891–1965), British footballer
Richard D. Field (physicist) (born 1943), United States physics professor

See also 
Rich Field, defunct military field in Texas
Richard Fields (disambiguation)